René Navarre (8 July 1877 – 8 February 1968) was a French actor of the silent era. He appeared in 109 films between 1910 and 1946, and was often credited simply as Navarre. His most famous role was probably the master criminal Fantômas.

Selected filmography
  La Hantise (1912)
 Fantômas (1913)
 Jean Chouan (1926)
 Belphégor (1927)
 The Veil Dancer (1929)
 Prince Jean (1934)
 Judex (1934)
 His Uncle from Normandy (1939)
 Radio Surprises (1940)

References

External links

1877 births
1968 deaths
People from Limoges
French male film actors
French male silent film actors
20th-century French male actors